Gakidama ( English: Baby Goblin) is a Japanese horror film based on the novel of the same name by Baku Yumemakara.  The 54-minute creature feature was directed by Masayoshi Sukita and released in 1985.  A combination of Japanese folklore and contemporary horror standards, the story concerns a flesh-eating hitodama (a gakidama) and its attacks on a journalist and those near him.

References

External links
 

1980s Japanese films
1985 films
1985 horror films
films based on Japanese novels